The Wu Chung House is a 40-floor skyscraper located on 213 Queen's Road East, in the Wan Chai area of Hong Kong. It was completed in 1992.

Tenants
The building houses a number of important Hong Kong institutions, notably the offices of The Hong Kong Competition Commission, Hong Kong Department of Health, Hopewell Holdings and the Hongkong Post. It is named after Wu Chung, the father of current Hopewell Holdings chairman Gordon Wu.

The lobby is located on the first floor and is accessed via an escalator from the outside.

References

Queen's Road East
Hopewell Holdings
Skyscraper office buildings in Hong Kong
Wan Chai

Office buildings completed in 1992